The Tree of Life is a large three-dimensional mural by artist Manav Gupta, located across the interior staircase of the Bharti Airtel office building in Gurgaon, India. Covering approximately 5,000 sq ft of facade space and 10,000 sq ft of total painted surface, it is the tallest and largest indoor staircase mural. While deploying site specific collaborative art practice of allowing more than 1000 employees of the office building, to participate in the experience of painting in the initial phase, the artist conceptualised the creation as a public art project.

Innovation of methodology
The methodology of creation was the first-of-its-kind simultaneous use of four different art practices engaging in conceptual, site specific, collaborative, and performance art.  Gupta allowed  the 3500 employees at the site, the experience of putting their brush strokes, while on their job, in the initial half of the project. As a part of his performance art, he executed a series of roles while teaching and motivating employees. At the same time, the artist engaged the employees in his practice of team-building exercise through art while creating a five floor high artwork.
                                                    
In the second half of the project, the colours and strokes were taken as raw stock for creating the composition. He proceeded with the three-month performance art alone; live in front of 3500 employees and almost as many visitors at the site (the campus) to evolve a storyline. Keeping in mind the visibility of the staircase all over the campus through a 60 ft high glass facade, the site specific intervention amalgamated the background wall and the front face of the staircase perspectives of five floors into a single canvas merging surrounding sides and roof within one composition.

Performance art marathon

The other notable feature of the invention was a marathon performance by the artist working non stop on his creation for three months except for few hours of rest and sleep at night.

Concept 

When commissioned by Bharti Airtel Ltd to create a “staircase artwork”  at their headquarters, the artist brought forth his idea born out of a decade and a half practice of public art projects to a radical reorientation towards introducing a unique sustainable development process in corporate entity, thus establishing that the art can contribute to the business environment as well, by refreshing the intangible quality of its soft power among employees.

The evolving storyline
A philosophical perspective was highlighted in the artist's statement while addressing the translation of his sustainable development ideology in his site specific intervention.

References

Contemporary works of art
Murals
2010 paintings
Indian art
Performance art
Public art
Paintings in India